Georg Anton Rasmussen (7 August 1842, Stavanger - 23 October 1914, Berlin) was a Norwegian landscape painter who spent most of his career in Germany.

Biography 
From 1864 to 1867, he completed his studies at the Kunstakademie Düsseldorf with Oswald Achenbach and was influenced by the works of Hans Gude. After completing his studies, he remained in Düsseldorf.

From 1868 to 1900, he was a member of Malkasten, a local artists' association. The variety of his landscapes diminished after 1870, when he began devoting himself almost entirely to fjords. This was probably in response to the preferences of the tourist trade. They were especially popular in Germany. In 1899 he moved to Berlin, but returned to Norway every summer to sell his paintings. After 1900, he turned to painting with a palette knife and brightened his colors, in imitation of Adelsteen Normann.

His paintings always included foregrounds with people and boats; occasionally houses. Many of his works were copied and sold as prints. Some art historians maintain that he would be better known today if he had become a member of the Berlin Secession.

His works may be seen at the National Gallery of Denmark, the Deutschen Schifffahrtsmuseum in Bremerhaven, the Gemäldegalerie Dresden and the Kunstmuseum Düsseldorf. A large number of his paintings are held in storage by the Bergen Museum of Art & Science.

References

Further reading

External links 

 More works by Rasmussen @ ArtNet

1842 births
1914 deaths
Norwegian landscape painters
Norwegian emigrants to Germany
19th-century Norwegian painters
20th-century Norwegian painters
Norwegian male painters
19th-century Norwegian male artists
20th-century Norwegian male artists